Rory Gonsalves (born 27 April 1979) is an Antiguan cyclist. He competed in the men's cross-country mountain biking event at the 1996 Summer Olympics.

References

External links
 

1979 births
Living people
Antigua and Barbuda male cyclists
Olympic cyclists of Antigua and Barbuda
Cyclists at the 1996 Summer Olympics
Place of birth missing (living people)